Robert Stanton (1900-1983) was an American architect. A resident of Carmel, California, he practiced primarily in the central California coastal region, and was responsible for a variety of eclectic buildings, most notably the Monterey County Court House and the King City Joint Union High School Auditorium, both listed on the National Register of Historic Places. He worked closely with sculptor Joseph Jacinto Mora on several of his projects.

Early life

Stanton was born in Detroit, Michigan in 1900. His mother was a singer in the B.O. Whitney Opera Company. Stanton joined the U.S. Navy during World War I, then graduated from the Manual Arts High School in Los Angeles, California. From there he went on to architectural studies at the University of California, Berkeley from 1921 to 1923, where he was involved in theater productions. Following his studies he went on a grand tour of Europe.

Career
On returning to the United States he worked in Pasadena, California for architect Wallace Neff, gaining licenses for architecture and real estate. In 1925, Stanton built his office in downtown Carmel on Monte Verde Street and Ocean Avenue. This building became the Normandy Inn. In the 1950s, he designed a flower shop at the southwest corner of Ocean Avenue and Monte Verde Street that became a retail store. 

In 1935 Stanton opened his own office in the Hotel Del Monte in Monterey, establishing a practice that included school and hospital work in the Monterey area and across the San Joaquin Valley.

In addition to the Monterey County Court House and the King City High School Auditorium, Stanton designed schools in Monterey, the San Benito County Hospital, the Salinas General Hospital, and buildings at Fort Ord.

He supervised the construction of homes for Bob Hope, King C. Gillette, Frederic March, and King Vidor. One of the most notable work was the mansion "Pickfair' in Veverly Hills, for Douglas Fairbanks Sr. and Mary Pickford.

He was president of the Monterey County Symphony Association, the Monterey Museum of Art, Cumminty Chest, Monterey History and Art Association, the Old Monterey Bicentennial, and the Monterey Chapter of the American Institute of Architects.

Stanton met his wife Virginia Young at Berkeley University. They had three children.

Death

Stanton died at his home in Carmel Valley on September 1, 1983, at the age of 83.

References

Architects from Pasadena, California
1900 births
1983 deaths
Fellows of the American Institute of Architects
UC Berkeley College of Environmental Design alumni
20th-century American architects
People from Carmel-by-the-Sea, California